Lyman Enos Knapp (November 5, 1837 – October 9, 1904) was an American lawyer, journalist, and politician who served as the Governor of the District of Alaska from 1889 to 1893. He was also a member of the Vermont House of Representatives from 1884 to 1885.

Early life and education
Knapp was born November 5, 1837 in Somerset, Vermont to Hiram and Elvira (Stearns) Knapp. He was educated in Manchester, Vermont, first attending Burr and Burton Academy and then graduating with a Bachelor of Arts from Middlebury College in 1862.

Career

Military service 
After graduating from college, Knapp enlisted as a private in the Company I, 16th Vermont Infantry Regiment and was quickly promoted to captain of Company F, 17th Vermont Infantry Regiment. During his military service, he was wounded at Gettysburg, Spotsylvania, and Petersburg. Knapp rose to the rank of lieutenant colonel and was brevetted a colonel for his gallantry during the Siege of Petersburg.

Vermont 
Following the war, Knapp returned to Vermont where he published the Middlebury Register from 1865 till 1878. In addition to the work on his own newspaper, he submitted articles to the Chicago Inter Ocean and the American Law Register. Beyond his journalistic efforts, Knapp served as Clerk of the Vermont Legislature during the 1872–1873 session. After being admitted to the bar in 1876, he served as a probate judge for the Addison district from 1879 to 1889. Knapp was also elected for a term in the Vermont House of Representatives from 1884 to 1885.

Governor of Alaska
Knapp was appointed Governor of the District of Alaska by President Benjamin Harrison, his term beginning on April 20, 1889. At the time of his appointment, many Alaskans desired a resident governor and were disappointed receiving an "outsider". The district did, however, see a number of improvements during his administration. Knapp also helped establish a historical society and library.

On the legal front, Knapp asked for Alaska to be granted a delegate to the U.S. Congress. He also supported creation of a commission to revise the district's legal code and, arguing that lack of clear land possession discouraged improvements, lobbied for a revision of the land possession laws. To help maintain law and order, Knapp help organize both a militia and Indian police. The former turned into a source of amusement for some area residents due to the governor's predilection for dressing in his military uniform and watch the militia parade before him.

During his term, an international dispute over seal fisheries reached a zenith. The United States, claiming that seals from Alaska were being killed by Canadian and other ships on the high seas, had seized several ships and brought them to Sitka. Arbitration to resolve the dispute was agreed to in 1891 between Canada, the United Kingdom, and the United States. As a result a set of restrictions was imposed on seal hunting near Alaska. Knapp was replaced as governor on August 29, 1893, following the appointment of James Sheakley by President Grover Cleveland.

Later career
Following his term as governor, Knapp moved to Seattle and established a law practice. He was active in civil organizations such as the Institute of Civics and National Geographic Society and received an honorary LL.D. from Whitman College in 1893. Knapp was also the founder and president of the Anti-Saloon League of Washington. He remained active in the practice of law until his death on October 9, 1904.

Personal life 
On January 23, 1865, Knapp married Martha A Severance of Middlebury, Vermont. The couple had four children.

References

1837 births
1904 deaths
Alaska Republicans
People from Windham County, Vermont
Middlebury College alumni
Union Army colonels
People of Vermont in the American Civil War
Vermont state court judges
Members of the Vermont House of Representatives
Governors of the District of Alaska
Vermont Republicans
19th-century American politicians
19th-century American judges